Trox sonorae is a beetle of the family Trogidae.

References 

sonorae
Beetles described in 1854